In mathematics, specifically transcendental number theory, Schanuel's conjecture is a conjecture made by  Stephen Schanuel in the 1960s concerning the transcendence degree of certain field extensions of the rational numbers.

Statement

The conjecture is as follows:

The conjecture can be found in Lang (1966).

Consequences

The conjecture, if proven, would generalize most known results in transcendental number theory.  The special case where the numbers z1,...,zn are all algebraic is the Lindemann–Weierstrass theorem.  If, on the other hand, the numbers are chosen so as to make exp(z1),...,exp(zn) all algebraic then one would prove that linearly independent logarithms of algebraic numbers are algebraically independent, a strengthening of Baker's theorem.

The Gelfond–Schneider theorem follows from this strengthened version of Baker's theorem, as does the currently unproven four exponentials conjecture.

Euler's identity states that ei + 1 = 0.  If Schanuel's conjecture is true then this is, in some precise sense involving exponential rings, the only relation between e, and i over the complex numbers.

Although ostensibly a problem in number theory, the conjecture has implications in model theory as well.  Angus Macintyre and Alex Wilkie, for example, proved that the theory of the real field with exponentiation, exp, is decidable provided Schanuel's conjecture is true.  In fact they only needed the real version of the conjecture, defined below, to prove this result, which would be a positive solution to Tarski's exponential function problem.

Related conjectures and results

The converse Schanuel conjecture is the following statement: 
Suppose F is a countable field with characteristic 0, and e : F → F is a homomorphism from the additive group (F,+) to the multiplicative group (F,·) whose kernel is cyclic. Then there exists a field homomorphism h : F →  such that h(e(x)) = exp(h(x)) for all x in F.

A version of Schanuel's conjecture for formal power series, also by Schanuel, was proven by James Ax in 1971. It states:

As stated above, the decidability of exp follows from the real version of Schanuel's conjecture which is as follows:
Suppose x1,...,xn are real numbers and the transcendence degree of the field (x1,...,xn, exp(x1),...,exp(xn)) is strictly less than n, then there are integers m1,...,mn, not all zero, such that m1x1 +...+ mnxn = 0.
A related conjecture called the uniform real Schanuel's conjecture essentially says the same but puts a bound on the integers mi.  The uniform real version of the conjecture is equivalent to the standard real version.  Macintyre and Wilkie showed that a consequence of Schanuel's conjecture, which they dubbed the Weak Schanuel's conjecture, was equivalent to the decidability of exp.  This conjecture states that there is a computable upper bound on the norm of non-singular solutions to systems of exponential polynomials; this is, non-obviously, a consequence of Schanuel's conjecture for the reals.

It is also known that Schanuel's conjecture would be a consequence of conjectural results in the theory of motives. In this setting Grothendieck's period conjecture for an abelian variety A states that the transcendence degree of its period matrix is the same as the dimension of the associated Mumford–Tate group, and what is known by work of Pierre Deligne is that the dimension is an upper bound for the transcendence degree. Bertolin has shown how a generalised period conjecture includes Schanuel's conjecture.

Zilber's pseudo-exponentiation

While a proof of Schanuel's conjecture seems a long way off, connections with model theory have prompted a surge of research on the conjecture.

In 2004, Boris Zilber systematically constructed exponential fields Kexp that are algebraically closed and of characteristic zero, and such that one of these fields exists for each uncountable cardinality.  He axiomatised these fields and, using Hrushovski's construction and techniques inspired by work of  Shelah on categoricity in infinitary logics, proved that this theory of "pseudo-exponentiation" has a unique model in each uncountable cardinal.  Schanuel's conjecture is part of this axiomatisation, and so the natural conjecture that the unique model of cardinality continuum is actually isomorphic to the complex exponential field implies Schanuel's conjecture. In fact, Zilber showed that this conjecture holds if and only if both Schanuel's conjecture and another unproven condition on the complex exponentiation field, which Zilber calls exponential-algebraic closedness, hold. As this construction can also give models with counterexamples of Schanuel's conjecture, this method cannot prove Schanuel's conjecture.

References

External links

Conjectures
Unsolved problems in number theory
Exponentials
Transcendental numbers